Allen Roach (born 9 March 1952) is a Canadian politician, who was elected to the Legislative Assembly of Prince Edward Island in the 2011 provincial election. He represented the district of Montague-Kilmuir as a member of the Prince Edward Island Liberal Party until his resignation after deciding not to run in the 2019 Prince Edward Island general election.

In October 2011, Roach was appointed to the Executive Council of Prince Edward Island as Minister of Innovation and Advanced Learning. He retained the portfolio when Wade MacLauchlan took over as premier in February 2015, but was given an additional role as Minister of Fisheries, Aquaculture and Rural Development. On May 20, 2015, Roach was moved to Minister of Finance. Roach resigned his cabinet position as finance minister on January 10, 2018, after announcing that he would not run in the 2019 election.

References

External links
 Legislative Assembly of PEI biography

Living people
People from Souris, Prince Edward Island
Prince Edward Island Liberal Party MLAs
Members of the Executive Council of Prince Edward Island
21st-century Canadian politicians
Finance ministers of Prince Edward Island
Royal Canadian Mounted Police officers
1952 births